The Pakhtunkhwa Mazdoor Kisan Party (PMKP) or Pukhtoonkhwa Mazdoor Kissan Party was a Pashtun nationalist political party in Pakistan. It was formed by Sher Ali Bacha in 1979, as a split from the Maoist Mazdoor Kisan Party.

In 1989, PMKP merged into the Pashtunkhwa National Awami Party (PNAP) of Mahmood Khan Achakzai to create the Pashtunkhwa Milli Awami Party (PMAP), with Mahmood Khan Achakzai as the chairman and Sher Ali Bacha as the General Secretary.

References

External links

1979 establishments in Pakistan
Agrarian parties in Pakistan
Defunct agrarian political parties
Defunct political parties in Pakistan
Nationalist parties in Asia
Political parties established in 1979